Prince Yahshua (born March 21, 1970) is an American pornographic film actor and director.

Career
Yahshua made his debut in the industry in 2004 around the age of 34. During his early work Yahshua first appeared with everyman features before undergoing a makeover, after which he shaved his head and built a 200 lb (91 kg) muscular physique. He also began wearing socks and Timberland work boots during his scenes, becoming his trademark appearance. He also maintained the same stage name during the course of his career, despite variations in its spelling.

On August 23, 2010, Yahshua sustained a penile fracture during a shoot with Bethany Benz for West Coast Productions. He was rushed to Encino Hospital Medical Center and received emergency operation
, which lasted three and a half hours. He began physical therapy on September 10. It was initially diagnosed as a career-ending injury, but doctors later informed Yahshua that he would be able to resume working after sixty days. He received financial support from West Coast Productions during that time.

Yahshua signed with LA Direct Models in September 2011. He left the agency in July 2012 and began handling his own bookings. In April 2013, he signed with OC Modeling.

On August 20, 2013, Yahshua sustained another penile injury on set. Facing over $32,000 in medical costs, OC Modeling set up a fundraiser for him at GiveForward.com. He has since resumed performing in the industry.

Awards
 2009 Urban X Award – Best Couple Sex Scene (Black Assassin 3) with Kirra Lynne
 2009 Urban X Award – Best Three-Way Sex Scene (Deep in Latin Cheeks) with Mya Nichole & Rico Strong
 2010 Urban X Award – Male Performer of the Year
 2010 Urban X Award – Best Group Sex Scene (Dynamic Booty 4) with Melrose Foxx, Emma Heart, Rico Strong & C.J. Wright
 2011 AVN Award – Best Three-Way Sex Scene - G/B/B (Asa Akira Is Insatiable) with Asa Akira & Jon Jon
 2011 Urban X Award – Male Performer of the Year
 2012 Urban X Award – Male Performer of the Year
 2012 Urban X Award – Best Anal Sex Scene (Prince The Penetrator) with Kagney Linn Karter
 2012 XBIZ Award – Performer Comeback of the Year
 2012 XRCO Award – Best Cumback
 2014 AVN Award – Best Double-Penetration Sex Scene (Skin) with Skin Diamond & Marco Banderas
 2019 XBIZ Award - Best Sex Scene - All-Sex Release (Joanna Angel Gangbang: As Above, So Below  (with Joanna Angel, Ricky Johnson &Isiah Maxwell)

References

External links

 
 
 
 

1970 births
African-American pornographic film actors
American male pornographic film actors
American pornographic film directors
Living people
Male actors from Chicago
Pornographic film actors from Illinois
21st-century African-American people
20th-century African-American people